A soul is the incorporeal essence of a living being.

Soul may also refer to:

Arts and entertainment

Film
Dusha (lit. Soul), a 1981 Soviet film
Soul (2013 film), a Taiwanese film
Roh (film), a 2019 Malaysian horror film 
Soul (2020 film), an American animated film
The Soul (film), a Chinese/Taiwanese film

Literature
Soul (novella), a 1935 novella by Andrey Platonov
"Souls" (story), a 1982 novella by Joanna Russ

Music
Soul music, a genre

Artists
Souls (band), a Bangladeshi rock band
Sounds of Unity and Love, a 1970s American funk band
Soul, a member of the band Superorganism

Albums
Soul (Eric Church album) (2021)
Soul (Coleman Hawkins album), 1958
Soul (The Kentucky Headhunters album), 2003
Soul (Lena Horne album), 1966
Soul (Ray Bryant album), 1965
Soul (Ravenhill album) or the title song, 2015
Soul (Seal album), 2008
Soul (soundtrack), from the 2020 film

Songs
"Soul", by Celine Dion from Courage, 2019
"Soul", by Girls' Generation from Mr.Mr., 2014
"Soul" (Lee Brice song), from Hey World, 2022
"Soul", by Manabu Oshio, 2002
"Soul", by Matchbox Twenty from More Than You Think You Are, 2002

Television
Soul (Canadian TV series), a 2009 dramatic miniseries
Soul (South Korean TV series), a 2009 crime horror series
Soul!, a 1970s American public television program
BET Soul, originally VH1 Soul, an American pay television network
Fox Soul, a streaming digital television network

Video games
Soulcalibur, fighting game series by Bandai Namco
Dark Souls, a series of video games by FromSoftware
Dark Souls, first game in the series
Demon's Souls, a similarly named game by FromSoftware
Soulslike, a video game genre inspired by Dark Souls

People
David Soul (born 1943), American actor and singer
Joseph Soul (1805–1881), British reformer
Maelcum Soul (1940–1968), American artist, artist's model, and actress

Sports
Philadelphia Soul, an Arena Football League team
Summer Omaha Ultimate League, an amateur ultimate league

Other 
Kia Soul, an automobile by Kia Motors
Soul (building), a residential tower on the Gold Coast, Queensland, Australia
Soul theorem, in mathematics, a result in Riemannian geometry
Soul, an Australian telecommunications company merged into TPG
Soul, a unit of account for measuring numbers of serfs in Imperial Russia

See also 
Seoul (disambiguation)
Seven souls (disambiguation)
Sol (disambiguation)
Sole (disambiguation)
Soul food (disambiguation)
Soul Song (disambiguation)
Soule (disambiguation)